Jordan competed at the 2008 Summer Olympics in Beijing, China. The country sent a total of seven competitors to the Games.

Athletics

Men

Women

Equestrian

Show jumping

Swimming 

Men

Women

Table tennis

Taekwondo

References

Nations at the 2008 Summer Olympics
2008
Olympics